Zaki Ibrahim is a South African-Canadian singer-songwriter. Her music blends R&B, soul and jazz.

Career
Born in British Columbia to a father from South Africa and a mother from the United Kingdom, Ibrahim spent her childhood as what she describes as a "citizen of the world", living at different times in Canada, South Africa, the United Kingdom and France . Her father, Zane Ibrahim, was a pioneering radio broadcaster in South Africa, who was one of the founders of the influential community radio station Bush Radio.

She moved to Toronto, Ontario in the mid-2000s, and soon became a popular draw on the city's live music scene. She released her debut EP, Shö (Iqra in Orange), in 2006. Following one show at the El Mocambo in 2007, her production team and supporting musicians immediately formed an assembly line to produce and burn a compact disc recording of the just-completed show for immediate sale; the lineup to purchase copies extended well outside the club's front door.

She released a second EP, Eclectica (Episodes in Purple), in 2008. Her live shows to support the EP included an appearance with Bedouin Soundclash at the 2008 MuchMusic Video Awards, and a show opening for Erykah Badu at Massey Hall. She garnered a Juno Award nomination for R&B/Soul Recording of the Year at the Juno Awards of 2009 for her single "Money". Her song "Ansomnia" was included in the 2010 film soundtrack For Colored Girls: Music From and Inspired by the Original Motion Picture Soundtrack.

Her first full-length album, Every Opposite, was released in 2012. The album was named as a longlisted nominee for the 2013 Polaris Music Prize on June 13, 2013, and subsequently named to the short list on July 16, 2013. 

She is currently based in Toronto Ontario.

Albums
Shö (Iqra in Orange) - 2006
Eclectica (Episodes in Purple) - 2008
Every Opposite - 2012
The Secret Life of Planets - 2018

References

External links
 
 

Canadian rhythm and blues singers
Canadian soul singers
Canadian women jazz singers
Canadian people of British descent
Canadian people of South African descent
Musicians from British Columbia
Living people
South African rhythm and blues musicians
South African jazz singers
21st-century South African women singers
Musicians from Cape Town
Year of birth missing (living people)
21st-century Canadian women singers